Acacia mooreana is a shrub belonging to the genus Acacia and the subgenus Phyllodineae that is endemic to south western Australia.

Description
It has glabrous to sparsely haired and yellow-ribbed branchlets. Like most species of Acacis it has phyllodes rather than true leaves. It blooms from May to September and produces yellow-cream flowers.

Taxonomy
The species was first formally described by the botanist William Vincent Fitzgerald in 1904 in the work Additions to the West Australian Flora as published in the Journal of the West Australian Natural History Society. It was reclassified by Leslie Pedley in 2003 as Racosperma mooreanum then transferred back to genus Acacia in 2006.

Distribution
It is native to an area along the south coast in the South West and Great Southern regions of Western Australia where it is commonly situated along drainage lines or in swampy areas growing in sandy soils often over and around laterite. The bulk of the population is found from around Yallingup in the west to Boyanup in the north down to August in the south west to around Nannup in the south east where it is usually found as a part of Eucalyptus forest communities.

See also
 List of Acacia species

References

mooreana
Acacias of Western Australia
Taxa named by William Vincent Fitzgerald
Plants described in 1904